The 1939 Denver Pioneers football team was an American football team that represented the University of Denver as a member of the Mountain States Conference (MSC) during the 1939 college football season. In their first season under head coach Cac Hubbard, the Pioneers compiled a 5–3–1 record (3–2–1 against conference opponents), finished in third place in the MSC, and outscored opponents by a total of 129 to 75.

Schedule

References

Denver
Denver Pioneers football seasons
Denver Pioneers football